The 2017 Boise State Broncos football team represented Boise State University during the 2017 NCAA Division I FBS football season. This season was the Broncos' 81st season overall, seventh as a member of the Mountain West Conference and fifth within the Mountain Division. The Broncos played their home games at Albertsons Stadium in Boise, Idaho. They were led by fourth-year head coach Bryan Harsin and first year quarterback Owen Smith, contributing to a monumental 2017 season with him in the command. They finished the season 11–3, 7–1 in Mountain West play to win the Mountain Division. They defeated West Division champion Fresno State in the Mountain West Championship Game to become Mountain West champions. They were invited to the Las Vegas Bowl where they defeated Oregon.

Preseason

Award watch lists
Listed in the order that they were released.

Rimington Trophy – Sr. C Mason Hampton

Chuck Bednarik Award – Jr. DT David Moa

Maxwell Award – Jr. QB Brett Rypien

Bronko Nagurski Trophy – Jr. DT David Moa

Outland Trophy – Sr. OT Archie Lewis & Jr. DT David Moa

John Mackey Award – Sr. TE Jake Roh

Paul Hornung Award – Sr. WR Cedrick Wilson Jr.

Fred Biletnikoff Award – Sr. WR Cedrick Wilson

Wuerffel Trophy – Jr. QB Brett Rypien

Davey O'Brien Award – Jr. QB Brett Rypien

Walter Camp Award – Jr. QB Brett Rypien

Manning Award – Jr. QB Brett Rypien

Mountain West media days
At the Mountain West media days, held at the Cosmopolitan in Las Vegas, Nevada, the Broncos were picked as the overwhelming favorites to win the Mountain Division title, receiving 21 of a possible 28 first place votes. Sr. OL Mason Hampton was selected to the all-conference first team offense. Jr. DL David Moa and Jr. DB Tyler Horton were selected to the all-conference first team defense.

Media poll

Mountain Division
 Boise State – 161 (21)
 Colorado State – 135 (6)
 Wyoming – 114 (1)
 Air Force – 82
 New Mexico – 68
 Utah State – 28

Schedule

Schedule Source

Game summaries

Troy

 Passing leaders: Brett Rypien (BSU): 15–27, 183 YDS, 1 INT; Brandon Silvers (Troy): 17–33, 146 YDS, 1 INT.
 Rushing leaders: Alexander Mattison (BSU): 13 CAR, 82 YDS, 1 TD; Jordan Chunn (Troy): 11 CAR, 41 YDS.
 Receiving leaders: Cedrick Wilson Jr. (BSU): 4 REC, 65 YDS; Damion Willis (Troy): 2 REC, 27 YDS.

at Washington State

 Passing leaders: Montell Cozart (BSU): 12–20, 161 YDS, 2 TD, 1 INT; Tyler Hilinski (WSU): 25–33, 235 YDS, 3 TD, 1 INT.
 Rushing leaders: Montell Cozart (BSU): 14 CAR, 72 YDS, 1 TD; James Williams (WSU): 14 CAR, 31 YDS.
 Receiving leaders: Cedrick Wilson (BSU): 9 REC, 147 YDS, 2 TD; Renard Bell (WSU): 7 REC, 107 YDS.

New Mexico

 Passing leaders: Montell Cozart (BSU): 15–19, 137 YDS, 2 TD; Coltin Gerhart (UNM): 7–13, 67 YDS, 1 TD, 1 INT.
 Rushing leaders: Montell Cozart	(BSU): 11 CAR, 68 YDS, 1 TD; Tyrone Owens (UNM): 14 CAR, 46 YDS, 1 TD.
 Receiving leaders: Cedrick Wilson (BSU): 3 REC, 64 YDS; Delane Hart-Johnson (UNM): 2 REC, 24 YDS.

Virginia

 Passing leaders: Brett Rypien (BSU): 24–42, 285 YDS, 1 INT; Kurt Benkert (UVA): 19–29, 273 YDS, 3 TD.
 Rushing leaders: Robert Mahone (BSU): 3 CAR, 21 YDS; Jordan Ellis (UVA): 24 CAR, 93 YDS, 2 TD.
 Receiving leaders: Cedrick Wilson (BSU): 13 REC, 209 YDS, 1 TD; Andre Levrone (UVA): 5 REC, 141 YDS, 2 TD.

at BYU

 Passing leaders: Brett Rypien (BSU): 12–19, 125 YDS, 1 TD, 1 INT; Tanner Mangum (BYU): 18–33, 164 YDS, 2 INT.
 Rushing leaders: Alexander Mattison (BSU): 29 CAR, 118 YDS, 2 TD; Ula Tolutau (BYU): 9 CAR, 38 YDS, 1 TD.
 Receiving leaders: Cedrick Wilson (BSU): 3 REC, 43 YDS; Matt Bushman (ABC): 7 REC, 65 YDS.

at San Diego State

 Passing leaders: Brett Rypien (BSU): 11–19, 72 YDS, 1 TD; Christian Chapman (SDSU): 12–27, 240 YDS, 1 TD.
 Rushing leaders: Alexander Mattison (BSU): 23 CAR, 128 YDS, 1 TD; Rashaad Penny (SDSU): 21 CAR, 53 YDS, 1 TD.
 Receiving leaders: Cedrick Wilson (BSU): 2 REC, 60 YDS; Fred Trevillion (SDSU): 2 REC, 128 YDS, 1 TD.

Wyoming

 Passing leaders: Brett Rypien (BSU): 12–17, 104 YDS; Josh Allen (WYO): 12–27, 131 YDS, 1 TD, 2 INT.
 Rushing leaders: Alexander Mattison (BSU): 17 CAR, 91 YDS; Josh Allen (WYO): 18 CAR, 62 YDS, 1 TD.
 Receiving leaders: Cedrick Wilson (BSU): 5 REC, 66 YDS, 1 TD; Austin Conway (WYO): 5 REC, 33 YDS.

at Utah State

 Passing leaders: Brett Rypien (BSU): 19–27, 260 YDS, 3 TD; Jordan Love (USU): 17–32, 168 YDS, 1 TD.
 Rushing leaders: Alexander Mattison (BSU): 19 CAR, 110 YDS; Tre Miller (USU): 7 CAR, 40 YDS.
 Receiving leaders: Cedrick Wilson (BSU): 6 REC, 94 YDS, 1 TD; Ron'quavion Tarver (USU): 3 REC, 77 YDS, 1 TD.

Nevada

 Passing leaders: Brett Rypien (BSU): 20–27, 258 YDS, 2 TD; Ty Gangi (NEV): 24–37, 160 YDS, 1 TD, 3 INT.
 Rushing leaders: Alexander Mattison (BSU): 12 CAR, 64 YDS, 2 TD; Kelton Moore (NEV): 17 CAR, 106 YDS, 1 TD.
 Receiving leaders: Cedrick Wilson (BSU): 5 REC, 80 YDS, 1 TD; Wyatt Demps (NEV): 6 REC, 61 YDS.

at Colorado State

 Passing leaders: Brett Rypien (BSU): 23–43, 315 YDS, 4 TD, 1 INT; Nick Stevens (CSU): 29–43, 309 YDS, 2 TD, 1 INT.
 Rushing leaders: Alexander Mattison (BSU): 23 CAR, 242 YDS, 3 TD; Dalyn Dawkins (CSU): 32 CAR, 161 YDS, 2 TD.
 Receiving leaders: Cedrick Wilson (BSU): 3 REC, 73 YDS; Michael Gallup (CSU): 11 REC, 102 YDS, 1 TD.

Alexander Mattison set the Boise State record for yards from scrimmage with 286 yards. Mattison rushed for 242 yards on the ground and picked up 44 receiving yards.

Air Force

 Passing leaders: Brett Rypien (BSU): 16–22, 300 YDS, 3 TD; Nate Romine (AF): 7–10, 115 YDS.
 Rushing leaders: Alexander Mattison (BSU): 17 CAR, 42 YDS; Nate Romine (AF): 16 CAR, 54 YDS, 1 TD.
 Receiving leaders: A. J. Richardson (BSU): 3 REC, 123 YDS, 1 TD; Marcus Bennett (AF): 3 REC, 63 YDS.

at Fresno State

 Passing leaders: Brett Rypien (BSU): 22–31, 278 YDS; Marcus McMaryion (FS): 23–36, 332 YDS, 2 TD.
 Rushing leaders: Alexander Mattison (BSU): 15 CAR, 63 YDS, 1 TD; Jordan Mims (FS): 11 CAR, 43 YDS, 1 TD.
 Receiving leaders: Cedrick Wilson (BSU): 7 REC, 134 YDS; KeeSean Johnson (FS): 6 REC, 119 YDS, 2 TD.

Fresno State (Mountain West Championship Game)

 Passing leaders: Brett Rypien (BSU): 16–32, 246 YDS; Marcus McMaryion (FS): 16–34, 172 YDS, 1 INT.
 Rushing leaders: Ryan Wolpin (BSU): 11 CAR, 50 YDS, 1 TD; Josh Hokit (FS): 9 CAR, 46 YDS.
 Receiving leaders: Cedrick Wilson (BSU): 8 REC, 148 YDS; KeeSean Johnson (FS): 5 REC, 58 YDS.

vs Oregon (Las Vegas Bowl)

 Passing leaders: Brett Rypien (BSU): 21–38, 362 YDS, 2 TD, 2 INT; Justin Herbert (UO): 26–36, 233 YDS, 2 TD, 2 INT.
 Rushing leaders: Ryan Wolpin (BSU): 23 CAR, 71 YDS, 2 TD; Justin Herbert (UO): 9 CAR, 17 YDS.
 Receiving leaders: Cedrick Wilson (BSU): 10 REC, 221 YDS, 1 TD; Dillon Mitchell (UO): 9 REC, 143 YDS.

Rankings

Post-season awards

Mountain West Defensive Player of the Year

Leighton Vander Esch – Jr. LB

Mountain West first team
Offense

Cedrick Wilson Jr. – Sr. WR

Jake Roh – Sr. TE

Mason Hampton – Sr. OL

Defense

Curtis Weaver – Fr. DL

Leighton Vander Esch – Jr. LB

Tyler Horton – Jr. DB

Mountain West second team
Offense

Brett Rypien – Jr. QB

Archie Lewis – Sr. OL

Avery Williams – Fr. PR/KR

Defense

Jabril Frazier – Jr. DL

David Moa – Jr. DL

Kekoa Nawahine – So. DB

Sean Wale – Sr. P

Mountain West honorable mention

Ezra Cleveland – FR. OL

Haden Hoggarth – Jr. K

Alexander Mattison – So. RB

Tyson Maeva – So. LB

Durrant Miles – Jr. DL

John Molchon – So. OL

DeAndre Pierce – So. DB

Award Reference:

Players in the 2018 NFL Draft

Personnel

Coaching staff

Roster

References

Boise State
Boise State Broncos football seasons
Mountain West Conference football champion seasons
Las Vegas Bowl champion seasons
Boise State Broncos football